was a district in Hyōgo Prefecture, Japan. The district was dissolved in 2005, and its  towns were merged into Mikata District and the city of Toyooka, both within Hyōgo Prefecture.

Former towns and villages
 Hidaka
 Kasumi
 Kinosaki
 Takeno

Mergers
 On April 1, 2005, the town of Kasumi was merged with the towns of Mikata and Muraoka (both from Mikata District) to create the town of Kami (in Mikata District).
 On April 1, 2005, the towns of Hidaka, Kinosaki, and Takeno, along with the towns of Izushi and Tantō (both from Izushi District), were merged into the expanded city of Toyooka. Kinosaki District was dissolved as a result of this merger.

Former districts of Hyōgo Prefecture